6-5=2 is a 2014 Indian Hindi-language found footage horror film. The film is a remake of the 2013 Kannada film of the same name which itself was inspired by the 1999 American movie The Blair Witch Project. Produced and directed by Bharat Jain, the film stars Niharica Raizada, Prashantt Guptha, Ashrut Jain, Gaurav Paswalla, Gaurav Kothari and Disha Kapoor in lead roles. Cinematography was conducted by Sathya Hegde, a prominent cinematographer in Kannada film industry. The film tells the story of a group of youngsters whose mountain trek goes awfully wrong. This is one of the first Hindi horror films in the found footage genre.

Plot

The film tells the story of six friends whose mountain trek goes awfully wrong. They encounter bizarre incidents during their mountain trek. These incidents are recorded in a video recorder.  The story is presented as they discovered video recordings left behind by characters who have died or gone missing.

Cast 
Niharica Raizada as Priya 
Prashantt Guptha as Sidharth
 Ashrut Jain as Bhanu
 Gaurav Paswalla as Raja
Gaurav Kothari as Harsh 
Disha Kapoor as Suhana

Production

The film is produced by Bharat Jain. The Hindi film is a big-budget version which costs are as much as a normal Hindi film. It is presented by Mars Inc presentation.

Reception

Official trailer of the film was released in the month of October and movie was released on 14 November 2014. The film managed to have good total box office collection on its first weekend.

References

External links
 

Hindi-language horror films
2014 films
2014 horror films
Hindi remakes of Kannada films
2010s Hindi-language films
Indian horror films
Found footage films